Lee Hsiu-chin (born 18 August 1992) is a Taiwanese footballer who plays as a midfielder for Taiwan Mulan Football League club Kaoshiung Sunny Bank and the Chinese Taipei women's national team.

International goals

References

1992 births
Living people
People from Taitung County
Taiwanese women's footballers
Women's association football midfielders
Chinese Taipei women's international footballers
Asian Games competitors for Chinese Taipei
Footballers at the 2014 Asian Games
Footballers at the 2018 Asian Games